Martin Meyer or similar names may refer to:
Martin Mayer (1928–2019), American business writer
Martin Meier (born 1984), Swiss bobsledder
Martin A. Meyer (1879–1923), American rabbi
Martin Meyerson (1922–2007), American city planner and university president
Martin Myers, member of Canadian band Waiting for God